Little Angel is Ana Johnsson's second album, released on October 18, 2006, in Sweden and in Japan on February 14, 2007. The album had sold over 20,500 copies in Japan by April 13, 2007.

Album information
The album was recorded half in Sweden and half in Finland. Two singles were released from the album; "Days of Summer" entered the Swedish singles charts at #7 and "Exception" at #10. In Japan, the album had two bonus tracks, "Falling to Pieces" (the B-side of the "Days of Summer" single) and a completely new track, "If I'm Not Dreaming". A new Japanese website by the Avex Trax record label was made for the release of Little Angel in Japan on which Johnsson said that she would be doing some promotion in Japan at the end of January.

The Japanese release became a CD/DVD release, with the CD containing the basic album tracks featuring, two bonus tracks and a video for "Exception".

Johnsson said of the album, "I wanted a more organic feeling this time, less of computer programming. To reach that we for instance use a lot of odd, old instruments. Some inspiration obviously comes from vintage American rock/grunge. But we still wanted to keep the Swedish 'flavour'." She continued, "We really wanted an overall album feeling this time. In the dynamics, in the song sequencing, in the cover graphics, etc. I really think we’ve fulfilled these ambitions." She linked album promotion to her skiing, saying, "This is really extraordinary since I spent all my life working the slopes. I was a semi-professional snowboarder in the Rocky Mountains in the late 90s and it was excellent that some of my promotion tours around "We Are" could be combined with skiing."

"Catch Me If You Can" was the official theme of the 2007 Alpine World Ski Championships. Johnsson performed in Åre on February 2 and 3, the first two days of the Championships.

The album is dedicated to Ana Johnsson's brother; the first page of the CD jacket says "For my Brother" in white lettering on a black background.

Track listings
Standard album

Japanese CD/DVD release

DVD
 "Exception" [music video] – 3:10
 Directed by: Peter Lindmark
 "A Day In The Life" [video]

Singles

Charts

Credits

Production
Vocals, backing vocals – Ana Johnsson
Executive producer, mixer, engineer, instruments – Leif Larson
Producer, backing vocals, keyboards – Tomi Malm
Producer, mixer, guitars – Mikko Raita
Producer, drums – Kasper Lindgren
Producer, guitars – Kalle Engström
Producer, instruments – Pontus Frisk
Mixer – Lasse Martén
Mixer – Ulf Kruckenberg
Mastered by – Björn Engelmann at Cutting Room Studios

Additional musicians
Guitars – Samuli Relander, Jaakko Murros, Timo Kämäräinen
Bass guitar – Lauri Porra
Drums – Mikko Kaakkuriniemi
Cello – Eva Maria Hux
Violin – Kreetta Hannula
Cello – Tuukka Helminen
Backing vocals (on track 3) – Dilba
Backing vocals (on track 5) – Caleb
Drum tech – Mikko Jr (Junior) Pietinen

Artwork

Photography – Morgan Norman
Additional photos – Christine Appleby, Gabor Palla
Record sleeve and artwork – Katarina Di Leva at Yogini

Release history

References

External links
 Avex Trax official website

Ana Johnsson albums
2006 albums
2007 albums
Articles containing video clips